Sarıyayla can refer to:

 Sarıyayla, Akçakoca
 Sarıyayla, Sason